Fuyang may refer to these places in China:

Fuyang (阜阳), a prefecture-level city in Anhui 
Fuyang District (富阳区), a district of Hangzhou, Zhejiang

Towns
Fuyang, Guangdong (浮洋), in Chaozhou, Guangdong
Fuyang, Guizhou (涪洋), in Wuchuan Gelao and Miao Autonomous County, Guizhou
Fuyang, Sichuan (涪阳), in Tongjiang County, Sichuan